Varayarangu, is an experimental Infotainment art genre from Kerala, which explores the performing level possibilities of Fine Art as a Stage Art . This 'Cartoon Stage Show' is a blend of poetry, anecdotes and socio-political satire with high speed drawing. World's Fastest Performing Cartoonist  Jitheshji has initiated and developed this art genre. The mode of presentation of this one-hour 'Cartoon Stage Show' is very captivating and enchanting  by means of  interlacing interesting anecdotes, light talk and social satire while drawing hundreds of celebrity caricatures on stage with a lightning pace and satirical commentary in order to create a new sensibility. Now, this art genre is onto 2000 stages since its launching on June 22, 2008, at Artist V. S. Valliathan's second death Anniversary Commemorative Meeting conducted at Pandalam in Pathanamthitta District, Kerala State.

External links
   www.hindu.com
The New Indian Express
www.yentha.com
www.hindu.com
www.hindu.com
 www.yentha.com
 www.hindu.com

Performance art
Art movements
Arts of Kerala
Performing arts in India
Theatre in India
Genres of Indian art
Schools of Indian painting